Shadmorad Mahalleh may refer to:
 Shadmorad Mahalleh, Gilan
 Shadmorad Mahalleh, Mazandaran